is a subway station in Edogawa, Tokyo, Japan, operated by Toei Subway. Its station number is S-17.

Line
Funabori Station is served by the Toei Shinjuku Line.

Station layout
Funabori Station consists of two side platforms served by two tracks.

Platforms

History
The station opened on December 23, 1983.

Surrounding area
The station is located just west of Tokyo Metropolitan Route 308 (Funabori-kaidō). Tower Hall Funabori, an Edogawa city citizen's hall, is north of the station. Although the immediate area has several large apartment and office buildings, the area is a mix of commercial, residential, and light industrial uses. Other points of interest include:
 Indian Temple - ISKCON New Gaya Japan & Vedic Culture Center
 Tokyo Kenkō Land
 Edogawa Municipal Matsue No. 1 Junior High School
 Funabori Post Office
 Kasai Police Station, Funabori branch
 Edogawa Municipal Funabori Elementary School
 Edogawa Municipal Funabori No. 2 Elementary School
 Funabori Sports Park
 Tathva International School

Connecting bus services
All services are operated by Toei Bus.

North exit
 Stop 3
 Shinko 21: for Nishi-Kasai Station
 Rinkai 22: for Rinkai garage
 Stop 4
 Kasai 24: for Nagisa New Town via Kasai Citizen's Hall & Kasai Station
 Stop 5
 Kin 25: for Nishi-Kasai
 FL01: for Nishi-Kasai (weekends and holidays only)
 Stop 6
 Kin 25: for Kinshichō Station via Keiyō intersection
 FL01: for Kinshichō Station via Higashi-Ōjima Station entrance (weekends and holidays only)

South exit
 Stop 1
 Shinko 21: for Shin-Koiwa Station
 Kin 27-2: for Koiwa Station
 Stop 2
 Kasai 26: for Kasai-Rinkai Park Station
 Funa 28: for Shinozaki Station
 Tei 11: for Edogawa-kyōteijō (free)

References

External links

 Tokyo Metropolitan Bureau of Transportation: Funabori Station 

Railway stations in Tokyo
Railway stations in Japan opened in 1983
Edogawa, Tokyo
1983 establishments in Japan